The 1985 FIA Formula One World Championship was the 39th season of FIA Formula One motor racing. It began on 7 April and ended on 3 November after sixteen races. The World Championship for Drivers was won by Alain Prost, and the World Championship for Manufacturers was won by McLaren for the second consecutive year.

Drivers and constructors

Calendar

Calendar changes

Originally the 1985 calendar had a new record number of 19 races; 2 more than the previous record number of 17 in 1977.

 Originally the Brazilian Grand Prix was due to take place on 10 March with Dallas as the second round on 24 March but was moved to 7 April (the originally scheduled date for the Japanese Grand Prix to return after a 8 year absence) after the Dallas Grand Prix initially scheduled for round 2 but became round 1 after the proposed Japanese Grand Prix earmarked as the third round was cancelled
The Dallas Grand Prix in Texas, USA, originally supposed to be held as the second race of the season on 24 March was cancelled because of financial problems, safety and organizational concerns.
The Japanese Grand Prix, originally scheduled for 7 April on a provisional calendar was cancelled as rebuilding parts of the Suzuka Circuit were too time consuming. It would last another two years for the race to be held at Suzuka.
The Portuguese Grand Prix was moved from late October to mid April.
The Belgian Grand Prix was originally scheduled on 2 June but was moved to 15 September because of the track surface breaking up badly. The change to the Belgian Grand Prix would be that Spa would be the permanent home of the Belgian Grand Prix as Zolder would be frozen out after FISA instituted a policy of long-term contracts with only one circuit per Grand Prix. 
The French Grand Prix was held at Paul Ricard Circuit after FISA instituted a policy of long-term contracts with only one circuit per Grand Prix and Dijon-Prenois was dropped.
The British Grand Prix was moved to Silverstone from Brands Hatch, in keeping with the event-sharing arrangement between the two circuits.
The German Grand Prix returned to the Nürburgring for 1985 replacing the Hockenheimring.
The South African Grand Prix was moved from early April to mid October.
The Australian Grand Prix hosted its first World Championship Grand Prix in 1985 with a multi-year contract. The race was held at the Adelaide Street Circuit in South Australia on 3 November.
A final attempt to put on a Grand Prix in New York City was scheduled for 22 September after the Italian Grand Prix, but this race was cancelled for the third year in a row. The rescheduled Belgian Grand Prix on 15 September replaced the New York race.
The European Grand Prix was going to be held in the Esposizione Universale Roma (EUR) district in Rome on 13 October but it was moved to Brands Hatch and held one week earlier. 
The Hungarian Grand Prix at the Népliget Park Circuit appeared on a provisional calendar to be held on 22 September but was cancelled as plans for a race in the park were difficult to achieve and the decision was made to build a new circuit: the Hungaroring in Mogyorod outside the city of Budapest would have its first race in 1986.
The Spanish Grand Prix at a new circuit in Fuengirola appeared on a provisional calendar and was cancelled for the second year in a row, this time due to organisational problems. In the end a decision was made to build a new circuit in Jerez where the race would be held from 1986.
The Mexican Grand Prix, originally to be held on 17 November as the final round was cancelled after the 1985 Mexico City earthquake destroyed much of the Mexican capital.

The cancellations of the Dallas and New York races meant that there was only one race in the United States in 1985, the Detroit Grand Prix.

Season review

Summary
The 1985 Formula One season saw continued success for the McLaren-TAG team. The Formula One writer Koen Vergeer remarked that "It was about time, everyone knew he was the best", reflecting a general feeling that Prost had been unlucky to finish runner-up in the previous two years, even though he had won more races than Piquet in 1983 and Lauda in 1984.

The reigning Drivers' Champion Lauda competed in his final season of Formula One, but he was unable to match Prost for results; he won only a single race, at Zandvoort. McLaren team boss Ron Dennis tried to persuade him to continue driving, but Lauda announced his decision to retire for good at the season's end in a press conference before practice for his home Grand Prix in Austria.

For most of the season, the points table was headed by Ferrari's Michele Alboreto, who enjoyed his best season in F1. He won the Canadian and German Grands Prix, and was on the podium eight times. However, Ferrari's results faded badly in the second half of the season as other emerging drivers took the fight to Prost.

Among these were Ayrton Senna and Nigel Mansell, both of whom scored their first victories in 1985. Lotus team manager Peter Warr had replaced Mansell with Senna going into the season, a decision which seemed justified when Senna took his debut win in the wet in Portugal in Round 2. Despite only scoring seven championship points up until Round 13 in Belgium, Mansell fought back the Williams-Honda, and chalked up two victories near the season's end, including his breakthrough win in the European Grand Prix at Brands Hatch. After Mansell had crashed his Lotus 95T out of the lead in the wet 1984 Monaco Grand Prix, Warr had said that he would "never win a Grand Prix as long as I have a hole in my arse". Mansell went on to mount a serious title challenge in 1986.

He finished third in the standings after wins on the street circuits of Detroit and Adelaide, but he lacked the reliability to overcome Prost.

1.5-litre turbocharged engines had become universal during 1985, heralding the extinction of the 3.0-litre naturally aspirated Ford Cosworth DFY engine. Between 1985 and 1986, Formula One engines would achieve the highest levels of power ever seen in the sport.

The power output of the engines was controlled in racing conditions by means of a strict fuel limit; however, in qualifying trim teams were commonly able to increase the boost of their engines for optimum power while the use of special qualifying tyres also saw speeds increase. This fuel economy was key to successful race strategy in 1985; Nigel Mansell recalled the added interest of planning his fuel use in his autobiography. It also proved costly for Ayrton Senna, who lost victory just four laps from home at Imola when he ran out of fuel. After Prost was disqualified for an underweight McLaren (2 kg), victory fell to Senna's Lotus teammate Elio de Angelis in what would prove to be his second and last Grand Prix win.

Michelin withdrew from Formula One for the 1985 season, leaving Goodyear and Pirelli as tyre suppliers. The top four teams in the Constructors' Championship used Goodyear tyres.

1985 also saw a return to the calendar of the Spa-Francorchamps circuit in Belgium after the Belgian Grand Prix had been held at Zolder in 1984. Although shortened from its dangerous 14 km form of 1947–1970, it remained a fast, flowing circuit and was popular with the drivers. It also caused one of the few cancellations of Grands Prix in the sport's history, when the new all-weather track surface laid down in the months before the race melted during the summer conditions in practice. The race was originally scheduled in early June between Monaco and Canada, and extensive repairs were needed and the race was rescheduled for September; on a semi-wet track, Senna was the winner, with Prost finishing on the podium again to take a big step towards his first championship.

The Dutch Grand Prix was the last Grand Prix for German driver Stefan Bellof, who died on 1 September 1985 in the World Sports Car Championship (now WEC) race at Spa at the high speed Eau Rouge corner. Bellof had won the 1984 World Endurance Championship driving for the factory Rothmans Porsche team, but decided against driving for the factory in 1985 to concentrate on Formula One. He nevertheless still drove in various WEC races for the private Brun team in a Porsche 956. Until his death, Bellof was considered one of the rising stars in racing and was rumored to have an offer to drive for Ferrari in 1986. Manfred Winkelhock was also killed in a WEC race. Winkelhock, who drove for the Skoal Bandit Formula 1 Team, died at Mosport Park in Canada when his Kremer Racing Porsche 962C crashed head on into the turn 2 wall at high speed. His co-driver for that race had been Brabham's Marc Surer.

The Australian Grand Prix, which was one of the world's oldest Grands Prix having first run in 1928, was added to the Formula One World Championship for the first time in 1985. The race was held in Adelaide, South Australia on a street circuit on 3 November as the last race of the season. The Adelaide Street Circuit was praised by the Formula One fraternity. The 50th running of the Australian Grand Prix won the Formula One Promotional Trophy for Race Promoter as the best race meeting of the year. Formula One Constructors Association (FOCA) boss and Brabham team owner Bernie Ecclestone said that Adelaide had raised the standards of what would be expected in the future and that several tracks in Europe already on the calendar, or hoping to be, would have to lift their own games in order to match it.

The 1985 season saw the first championship win out of four for Prost, the first two race wins (out of 31) for Mansell, and the first two race wins (out of 41) for Senna. Keke Rosberg's win in Adelaide was his final race for Williams as he was moving to McLaren in 1986 for what would be his final season in F1, and would prove to be the final win of his career.

This season was also the last full season for Alfa Romeo as a factory effort. It was also the last for Renault as a factory effort until , and the last to include a Dutch Grand Prix until . It also saw the last race at the original Kyalami and Zandvoort circuits, and the last South African Grand Prix until  due to political pressure over South Africa's Apartheid laws. 1985 also saw the last race at the full Paul Ricard Circuit with its 1.8 km long Mistral Straight, the longest straight on the calendar, with the much shorter "Club" version of the circuit used from 1986 following the death of Elio de Angelis in a testing accident. The season also saw the last European Grand Prix to be held at Brands Hatch, the last race with Monaco's dog leg corner and the last British Grand Prix at Silverstone with the Woodcote chicane, and the last win of 25 for Niki Lauda in his final season in Formula One.

Race by race

Race 1: Brazil
The first race of the season was the Brazilian Grand Prix in April, at the Autodromo De Jacarepagua in Rio de Janeiro. Michele Alboreto took pole in his Ferrari ahead of Keke Rosberg in a Williams-Honda and the two Lotuses of Ayrton Senna and Elio de Angelis. Rosberg retired with turbo failure, and McLaren-TAG/Porsche driver Alain Prost took 2nd after taking advantage of an accident involving Briton Nigel Mansell at the start. Prost chased Alboreto during the first half, unable to pass because of the Ferrari's superior straight-line speed. However, on the pit straight, Alboreto missed a gear, allowing Prost to take the lead and win the race from Alboreto and Elio de Angelis.

Race 2: Portugal
The 4½-month-long European tour started with the news that Ferrari driver René Arnoux had been sacked and replaced by Swede Stefan Johansson. No official explanation has ever been given by either Ferrari or Arnoux for the dismissal. The Portuguese Grand Prix was held at the Estoril Circuit near the capital of Lisbon. Although the practice sessions were held in good weather, it rained heavily for the race. Conditions were extremely difficult, and Ayrton Senna drove a race often regarded as one of Formula One's great wet-weather drives. He led the race from start to finish, and lapped everyone except 2nd-placed Alboreto on the way to his debut victory.

Race 3: San Marino (Imola, Italy)
The first of two Italian races was held at the fast Autodromo Dino Ferrari near Bologna. Ayrton Senna took pole again, and led until the final laps when his car ran out of fuel. The lead was taken by Stefan Johansson, who had started 15th and then dropped to 17th, but he too ran out of fuel after an electronics failure. Prost then took the lead, and barely made it over the finish line after having also run out of fuel. Prost was later disqualified for his car being underweight, and victory was handed to Elio de Angelis driving a Lotus-Renault.

Race 4: Monaco
The Monaco Grand Prix was originally supposed to be cancelled due to political wrangling, but it took place as scheduled. After pole-sitter Senna went out with engine problems, Alboreto took the lead, followed by Prost. Alboreto then slid on some oil at the first corner which had been dropped from the gearbox of Riccardo Patrese's Alfa Romeo after a collision with Nelson Piquet's Brabham-BMW. Prost took the lead after Alboreto's slip-up, but the Italian took the lead again from the Frenchman at the same place where he had gone off. However, another accident involving Patrese and Piquet caused more problems: Alboreto then punctured a tire, came into the pits to get his tires changed, dropping to 4th place behind Prost, and de Angelis and Andrea de Cesaris. He passed his fellow countrymen, but was not able to catch Prost, who won ahead of him and de Angelis.

Race 5: Canada
There was a 4-week gap between the Monaco and Canadian Grands Prix as the Belgian Grand Prix at Spa-Francorchamps was postponed until September, after the newly-laid track surface, to help deal with wet weather, melted due to the hot weather conditions. The Canadian Grand Prix at the Circuit Gilles Villeneuve in Montreal produced a Ferrari 1–2, with Alboreto winning ahead of Johansson, and Prost finishing third. It was Ferrari's first 1–2 since the 1983 Dutch Grand Prix and their last until the 1987 Australian Grand Prix.

Race 6: Detroit (USA)
The slowest and toughest race of the year was in the United States, at the angular Renaissance Center street circuit in the center of downtown Detroit, Michigan. Ayrton Senna took pole, 1.2 seconds ahead of the next fastest qualifier, Nigel Mansell. The Lotus combined with Senna’s raw driving talent proved to be well-suited to slow tracks, and Senna decided to take a chance by using harder tires than the rest of the field and try to go a greater distance. The Detroit Grand Prix, classic for being a race of attrition was no different as Keke Rosberg passed Prost, Mansell and Senna to take the lead – a lead he kept from start to finish on a circuit that, under the intense heat and humidity, broke up and made half the field retire. Prost, Mansell and Senna all crashed at the same corner at Atwater and St. Antoine Streets. Behind Rosberg were the two Ferraris of Johansson and Alboreto, the former pushing Rosberg hard for the lead.

Race 7: France
F1 returned to Europe to start the second European tour with the French Grand Prix at the very fast Circuit Paul Ricard with its long 1.1 mile Mistral straight. Keke Rosberg took pole position, averaging more than 140 mph. He was ahead of Senna, Alboreto, Prost and Nelson Piquet. The weather was hot, and after gaining places at the start, double world champion Piquet made the most of his BMW engine's superior power (this engine was the most powerful in F1 at the time) and Pirelli tires. After moving up to third at the start, Piquet passed Senna on the Mistral Straight, and then passed the leader Rosberg on Lap 11. Senna went into the pits and fell down the order; while driving hard to make up places he crashed heavily at the very fast Signes corner after the Mistral Straight when the Renault engine in his Lotus failed and dropped oil on the rear tires, and the car caught fire. Senna escaped uninjured. Rosberg had wrecked his tires early on, and was harried by Prost and his teammate, defending champion Niki Lauda. After a long battle where Rosberg held up the two McLarens and allowed Piquet to get away, Lauda retired with gearbox failure (the Austrian had only finished once in the season thus far), Prost eventually took Rosberg, who went into the pits to have his tires changed. Rosberg stormed after Prost, who was putting considerable pressure on Piquet. The Finn eventually passed Prost for 2nd, behind Piquet.

During qualifying, the turbocharged Brabham-BMW of Marc Surer reached a season-fastest  on the Mistral Straight.

Race 8: Great Britain
F1 went to England for the British Grand Prix, this year being held at Silverstone, which was the fastest Grand Prix circuit in the world at the time. Rosberg outlined this by averaging 160.9 mph in qualifying – more than 7 mph faster than the pole time set for the 1983 British GP. Senna, after starting 4th, took the lead at the start. He led for most of the race distance, after Rosberg and others fell out with mechanical trouble. Prost had dropped back early on to save fuel, and then climbed through the field to catch Senna. Prost's McLaren was well suited to fast circuits, and he pressured Senna. In an effort to stay in front of Prost, Senna turned the Renault's engine's turbo boost up, and this caused him to run out of fuel and retire from the race. After that, Prost built a huge lead, and lapped the rest of the field, including Alboreto, who finished 2nd. The chequered flag was shown in error at the end of the 65th lap, ending the race one lap before its scheduled distance. Jacques Laffite, who finished in 3rd place, ran out of fuel on what was supposed to be the last lap, the error thus depriving 4th placed Nelson Piquet of a podium finish.

Race 9: Germany
The German Grand Prix 1985 was held at the Nürburgring instead of the Hockenheimring like in previous years, although instead of the historic Nordschleife being used, the new GP track was utilized for the second time in Formula 1 history after being the European Grand Prix in 1984. After Senna and Rosberg collided while being harried by Alboreto, Prost and Jacques Laffite in a Ligier-Renault, Alboreto in his Ferrari took advantage of a rare spin by Prost to take his last F1 victory.

Race 10: Austria
The extremely fast Österreichring was the venue for the Austrian Grand Prix, which was dominated by McLaren drivers Prost and Lauda. Prost took pole at an average speed of more than 155 mph (250 km/h). The McLaren car was superior to all the others on this track, and after Lauda fell out with turbo failure, Prost took victory ahead of Senna and Alboreto. Ligier-Renault driver Andrea de Cesaris crashed heavily after making a mistake and losing his car at the Texaco bends, but emerged unscathed, thanks to the grassy surface made soft by rain the night before. He was fired from the Ligier team soon afterwards.

Race 11: Netherlands
The beach-side Circuit Park Zandvoort near Amsterdam hosted the Dutch Grand Prix. After pole-sitter Piquet stalled at the start, Rosberg took the lead, but the McLarens were to show their high-speed circuit superiority once again: after Rosberg retired with engine failure, Prost took the lead, ahead of Senna and Lauda. Lauda eventually passed the Brazilian, and took the lead from Prost while the Frenchman was in the pits. With a car that was not entirely set up to his liking, Lauda won by a car's length from Prost, who drove very hard to catch the Austrian. This was the triple-world champion's 25th and last Grand Prix victory, and it was also the last Dutch Grand Prix for 36 years – the track owners went bankrupt, and the back side of the Zandvoort circuit past the Marlborobocht was sold to developers.

Race 12: Italy
The Italian Grand Prix at the very fast Autodromo Nazionale di Monza saw Williams-Honda driver Rosberg dominate the race, but he retired with engine failure, and Prost took victory, ahead of Brazilians Piquet and pole-sitter Senna.

Race 13: Belgium
The rescheduled Belgian Grand Prix returned to the Circuit de Spa-Francorchamps, a track relished by drivers, even in the wet. Niki Lauda crashed his McLaren in practice, and injured his wrist; he would not take part in this weekend or the upcoming European GP. Prost took pole ahead of Senna, but Senna took an immediate lead into La Source, ahead of Piquet and Prost. Piquet then spun, and Senna started to break away. The race began in wet conditions but later dried. After most of the drivers changed onto slick tires after the conditions were found to be too dry for wet tires, Senna led most of the race, but was challenged by Nigel Mansell most of the way. Senna won his 2nd GP from Mansell and Prost. Prost, the championship leader, now had a firm lead over his closest challenger Alboreto – if Prost gained more points in the next race, he would be Drivers' Champion. This would end up filling a gap in the calendar left by the cancellation for the third year in a row of the New York Grand Prix.

Race 14: Europe
The European Grand Prix was originally scheduled on the 1985 calendar to be held on a street circuit in Rome but due to unknown reasons it was moved to the southern English Brands Hatch circuit, normally used for the British Grand Prix on even numbered years. Senna took his 6th pole position at an average speed of more than 140 mph (228 km/h). There had been some concerns about racing these very powerful cars at the small, very fast Brands Hatch circuit: Niki Lauda and a few other drivers felt the cars were too fast for a short circuit like Brands, and if the power of the engines increased over time, the circuit would have to be modified in order to accommodate the cars.
Senna led from pole position and was followed by Rosberg. Going into Surtees, Rosberg tried to get past Senna, but Senna took his line forcefully and Rosberg spun to avoid contact. Piquet hit Rosberg and retired, but Rosberg was able to get to the pits and returned to the track right in front of Senna who was then being harried by Mansell. Rosberg then held Senna up whilst going into Surtees, which enabled Mansell to overtake into the lead.
Mansell led the rest of the race distance, while Marc Surer in a Brabham-BMW got up to 2nd, but retired at Stirling's corner after a fire broke out on the back of his car. Meanwhile, Alboreto's car failed and caught fire; he drove it back to the Ferrari pit while still in flames. Prost dropped to 15th at the start, but finished in 4th, which was enough for him to become world Drivers' Champion for the first time. He finished behind Mansell, Senna, and Rosberg.

Race 15: South Africa
The South African Grand Prix, held at the very fast Kyalami circuit, had been a point of contention throughout the year: South Africa's Apartheid regime had declared a state of emergency, and controversy ensued throughout the year whether this race would take place or not. Governing body president Jean-Marie Balestre announced that the race would take place despite opposition from Renault and Ligier teams, who pulled out due to pressure from the French government.  With only 20 cars starting, Nigel Mansell took pole at an average speed of 147 mph (235 km/h). Rosberg took the lead, but then went off on some oil at Crowthorne which had been dropped by Piercarlo Ghinzani's Toleman, whose Hart engine had failed. Mansell took the lead from Rosberg and held it until the end. Rosberg drove hard and caught 2nd-placed Prost before the finish, who ran out of fuel, but was still classified 3rd to make it a Williams 1–2; Williams was the third team this year to finish a race 1–2, the others being Ferrari and McLaren. A few days after the race, it was announced that the South African GP would be struck off the calendar for 1986.

Race 16: Australia
The first ever world championship Australian Grand Prix was held on a street circuit in the city of Adelaide. Senna took his seventh pole position of the season by some margin on his superior-handling Lotus-Renault. However, he lost the lead to Lauda after a delayed pit stop. Lauda and Senna battled hard, and Senna eventually took the lead. Lauda crashed on the main straight due to brake failure in what was his last Grand Prix. Senna, retired with a misfiring engine, leaving Rosberg to win ahead of the two Ligier drivers Jacques Laffite and Phillippe Streiff, whom both crashed into each other on the main straight on the last lap.

Results and standings

Grands Prix

Scoring system

Points were awarded at each round to the top six finishers at each Grand Prix as follows:

For the drivers championship only the eleven best results contributed to the World Championship.

World Drivers' Championship standings

 Driver did not finish the Grand Prix, but was classified as he completed over 90% of the race distance.

Only drivers who scored points were classified by the FIA in the final championship results.

World Constructors' Championship standings

Only manufacturers that scored points were classified by the FIA in the final championship results.

Notes

References

External links
1985 Formula 1 review

Formula One seasons